Sarada superba, the superb large fan-throated lizard, is a species of agamid lizard found in Maharashtra, India. It was described in 2016 and in the past was part of a complex that included Sitana ponticeriana.

References

Sarada
Reptiles of India
Fauna of Maharashtra
Endemic fauna of the Western Ghats
Reptiles described in 2016
Taxa named by Veerappan Deepak